Arsenio Cruz Herrera (December 14, 1863 – April 8, 1917) was considered the first Filipino Mayor of Manila. He was also the leader of the Progresista Party from 1907 to 1914.

Early life
Arsenio was born on December 14, 1863, in Tondo, Manila. His parents were Tomás Cruz and Ambrosia Herrera. He studied in a school under Fortunato Jacinto, then at Colegio de San Juan de Letran where he received a degree of bachiller en artes (Bachelor of Arts) in 1880. He later enrolled at the University of Santo Tomas to attain a licentiate in canon law (1889) and jurisprudence (1892). At the University of Santo Tomas, he studied while working at the university library. He was able to start his own law office right after graduating, a firm where Juan Sumulong and Rafael Palma were later able to work as young lawyers. His law practice earned as much as eighty thousand pesos per year.

Career

Philippine Revolution
Little was known about his activities during the Philippine Revolution. According to Manuel Artigas, he advised General Maximo Hizon on the capture of Angeles, Pampanga. After the return of Emilio Aguinaldo in the Philippines, Cruz Herrera together with Ambrosio Rianzares Bautista and Felipe Buencamino.

First Philippine Republic
Cruz Herrera was offered the post as War Director of the new revolutionary government, a responsibility he refused to take. Antonio Luna was made War Director instead. Cruz Herrera rather chose to manage the official government newspaper, the El Heraldo de la Revolución. His efforts made the revolutionary government to establish the Universidad Cientifico-Literaria de Filipinas in 1899, where he taught law. During the Malolos Congress, he was elected as one of the four elected members from Manila. He was also part of the commission that drafted the Malolos Constitution, which was enacted on January 21, 1899. He later realized that the armed struggle for independence was vain, so he decided to cooperate with the Americans.

American period
Cruz Herrera was convinced on the peace plans of the Schurman Commission, and later joined a group that supported American autonomy in the Philippines. During the Taft Commission, he was appointed President of the Municipal Board of Manila. However, he did not enjoy any influence in the city legislation. He resigned on September 18, 1905. During the First Philippine Assembly elections and the Second Philippine Assembly elections, he led the Progresista Party and ran for Rizal's 1st district. He lost in both occasions, but he won the seat for Rizal's 1st District in the Third Philippine Assembly elections. His Progresista Party, however, never had the majority wrested from the Nacionalista Party from 1907 to 1912. On April 2, 1914, he moved to the Democrata Party.

Personal life
Cruz Herrera was first married on September 9, 1888, to married Julita Alejandrino, sister of the revolutionary general, José Alejandrino. They had eight children namely: José, Rosario, Miguel, Concepción, Augustín, Natividad, Augusto, and Emmanuela. On March 4, 1912, Julita died. Later, he married Bernarda Sastre. They did not have any children together.

Death
Cruz Herrera died on April 8, 1917 at the age of 53.

References
 
 

Mayors of Manila
1863 births
1917 deaths
Colegio de San Juan de Letran alumni
People from Tondo, Manila
Members of the House of Representatives of the Philippines from Rizal
Members of the Malolos Congress
Members of the Philippine Legislature